Norm Marshall (1918 – 5 November 2008) was a Canadian radio and television broadcaster. He and Larry O'Brien were commentators for the first telecast of a Grey Cup football game 29 November 1952 on CBLT Toronto. CBC paid both Marshall and O'Brien CAD$250 for this inaugural broadcast. He was inducted into the Canadian Football Hall of Fame in 1989.

Biography
Marshall's radio broadcasting career began with CKTB in St. Catharines, Ontario, first singing for the station then announcing. In 1940, he was broadcasting for CHML at Hamilton, Ontario. When CHCH-TV began broadcasts in that city in 1954, Marshall was among its first personalities.

The Fred Sgambati Media Award was awarded to Marshall in 1988 for his broadcast work for university sports.

CBC Television's pre-game segments for the 95th Grey Cup in November 2007 featured Marshall's recollection of the early Grey Cup broadcasts.

Career

Radio
 CKTB - St. Catharines, Ontario
 1940: CHML - Hamilton, Ontario
 CJAD - Montreal, Quebec
 CKLW - Windsor, Ontario
 WKBW - Buffalo, New York
 1953: Grey Cup radio commentator
 1967: CHAM - Hamilton, Ontario - operations manager

Television
 1952: CBC Television - commentator, Grey Cup broadcasts
 1954-1988: CHCH-TV - Hamilton, Ontario - news and sports announcer

References

1918 births
2008 deaths
Canadian radio personalities
Canadian television hosts
People from Hamilton, Ontario
Canadian Football League announcers
Canadian Football Hall of Fame inductees